Milton Road Halt (TQ 656 738  ) was a halt between Gravesend Central and Denton Halt on the Hundred of Hoo Railway in Kent, England. It opened in July 1906 and closed on 1 May 1915.

References

Sources.

External links
 Subterranea Britannica

Disused railway stations in Kent
Former South Eastern Railway (UK) stations
Railway stations in Great Britain opened in 1906
Railway stations in Great Britain closed in 1915
Gravesham